Acalyptris piculus is a moth of the family Nepticulidae. It was described by Puplesis in 1990. It is known from Tadzhikistan.

References

Nepticulidae
Endemic fauna of Tajikistan
Moths of Asia
Moths described in 1990